Simon Douglas Keynes,  (born 23 September 1952) is a British author who is Elrington and Bosworth Professor of Anglo-Saxon emeritus in the Department of Anglo-Saxon, Norse, and Celtic at Cambridge University, and a Fellow of Trinity College.

Biography
Keynes is the fourth and youngest son of Richard Darwin Keynes and his wife Anne Adrian, and thus a member of the Keynes family (and, by extension, of the Darwin–Wedgwood family). Two of his elder brothers are the conservationist and author Randal Keynes and the medical scientist and fellow fellow of Trinity Roger Keynes. He is the grandson of the surgeon Geoffrey Keynes and Nobelist Edgar Douglas Adrian, 1st Baron Adrian, grandnephew of the economist John Maynard Keynes and great-great-grandson of Charles Darwin. 

He was born in Cambridge and educated at King's College School, The Leys School and Trinity College, Cambridge.  He was lecturer in Anglo-Saxon History at Cambridge from 1978, reader in Anglo-Saxon History from 1992, and Elrington and Bosworth Professor of Anglo-Saxon, from 1999 until 2019. He has been a fellow of Trinity College since 1976.  From 1999 to 2006 he was head of the Department of Anglo-Saxon, Norse and Celtic.

He is a fellow of the Royal Historical Society, the Society of Antiquaries of London and the British Academy, and sits on various of the latter's committees.

Keynes is also co-editor of the journal Anglo-Saxon England, and is on the editorial board of Cambridge Studies in Anglo-Saxon England.  From 1993 to 2004 he was associate editor of the Oxford Dictionary of National Biography.

In 2017, Keynes became the recipient of a Festschrift, Writing, Kingship and Power in Anglo-Saxon England. He retired from his professorship on 1 October 2019, and was succeeded by Rosalind Love.

Selected publications
For a full list up to 2017, see 'Publications by Simon Keynes', in Writing, Kingship and Power in Anglo-Saxon England, ed. by Rory Naismith and David A. Woodman (Cambridge: Cambridge University Press, 2017), pp. xv-xxx , .The Diplomas of King Aethelred The Unready (978–1016): A Study in Their Use as Historical Evidence, 1980 Alfred the Great: Asser’s Life of King Alfred and Other Contemporary Sources, 1983 (trans., author of intro and notes, with M. Lapidge)Facsimiles of Anglo-Saxon Charters, 1991The Liber Vitae of the New Minster and Hyde Abbey Winchester, 1996
  

Bibliography

 Oliver Padel, 'Simon Keynes', in Writing, Kingship and Power in Anglo-Saxon England'', ed. by Rory Naismith and David A. Woodman (Cambridge: Cambridge University Press, 2017), pp. 18–22 , .

References

External links
Simon Keynes, Department of Anglo-Saxon, Norse and Celtic, University of Cambridge

British medievalists
Fellows of the British Academy
Fellows of the Royal Historical Society
Fellows of the Society of Antiquaries of London
1952 births
Simon
Living people
People educated at The Leys School
Alumni of Trinity College, Cambridge
Fellows of Trinity College, Cambridge
Elrington and Bosworth Professors of Anglo-Saxon